Anthonomus testaceosquamosus is a species of true weevil in the beetle family Curculionidae. It is found in North America. Its common name is the hibiscus bud weevil, as females lay their eggs in hibiscus flower buds.

References

Further reading

 
 

Curculioninae
Articles created by Qbugbot
Beetles described in 1897